Peter IV was the 34th Coptic Pope and Patriarch of Alexandria from 567 to 576. Peter IV succeeded the exiled Pope Theodosius I on the latter's death in 567.

Because the Melkites were in control of Alexandria at the time, Peter IV lived in exile in the Enaton monastic complex.

References
General

Specific

Dorotheos
576 deaths